Paul Vogel, A.S.C. (August 22, 1899 – November 24, 1975) was an American cinematographer. His credits included The Tell-Tale Heart (1941), Angels in the Outfield (1951), The Tender Trap (1955), High Society (1956), The Time Machine (1960), The Wonderful World of the Brothers Grimm (1962), Hold On!, and Return of the Seven (both 1966).

Vogel began his career in the 1920s and, aside from taking a break from film to serve in World War II, worked steadily until retiring in 1967. One of his more challenging films was Robert Montgomery's Chandler film noir Lady in the Lake (1947), which was completely shot from the point of view of the protagonist. In this movie, Montgomery appears as Marlowe only in the opening sequence and briefly at intervals thereafter, being present the rest of the while as the camera is present, with the result of making the audience seem to occupy the position of detective.

His brother, Joseph R. Vogel, was a vice president of Loew's, Inc. and later president of MGM.

Awards and nominations 
In 1949, he won the Academy Award for Best Cinematography for Battleground (1949).

Filmography 
 1927 : Running Wild - Gregory La Cava
 1932 : Freaks - Tod Browning
 1937 : Fit for a King - Edward Sedgwick
 1938 : Everybody's doing it - Christy Cabanne
 1938 : Wide Open Faces - Kurt Neumann
 1939 : They All Come Out - Jacques Tourneur
 1939 : The Ash can fleet - Fred Zinnemann
 1941 : The Tell-Tale Heart - Jules Dassin
 1941 : Army Champions - himself
 1942 : Pacific Rendezvous - George Sidney
 1942 : Sunday Punch - David Miller
 1942 : Kid Glove Killer - Fred Zinnemann
 1942 : Tish - S. Sylvan Simon
 1947 : Lady in the Lake - Robert Montgomery
 1947 : High Wall - Curtis Bernhardt
 1949 : Scene of the Crime - Roy Rowland
 1949 : Battleground - William A. Wellman
 1950 : Black Hand - Richard Thorpe
 1950 : Watch the Birdie - Jack Donohue
 1950 : The Happy Years - William A. Wellman
 1950 : A Lady Without Passport - Joseph H. Lewis
 1951 : Three Guys Named Mike - Charles Walters
 1951 : Angels in the Outfield - Clarence Brown
 1951 : The Tall Target - Anthony Mann
1951 :  Go For Broke! - Robert Pirosh
 1952 : The Girl in White - John Sturges
 1952 : You for Me - Don Weis
 1953 : The Clown - Robert Z. Leonard
 1953 : The Girl Who Had Everything - Richard Thorpe
 1953 : Arena - Richard Fleischer
 1953 : Half a Hero - Don Weis
 1954 : Rose Marie - Mervyn LeRoy
 1954 : Green Fire - Andrew Marton
 1954 : The Student Prince - Richard Thorpe
 1955 : The Tender Trap - Charles Walters
 1955 : The Scarlet Coat - John Sturges
 1955 : It's a Dog's Life - Herman Hoffman
 1955 : Interrupted Melody - Curtis Bernhardt
 1955 : Jupiter's Darling - George Sidney
 1956 : The Rack - Arnold Laven
 1956 : High Society - Charles Walters
 1957 : Bernardine - Henry Levin
 1957 : The Wings of Eagles - John Ford
 1957 : Public Pigeon No. 1 - Norman Z. McLeod
 1957 : Tarzan, the Ape Man - Joseph M. Newman
 1959 : The Gazebo - George Marshall
 1960 : The Time Machine - George Pal
 1962 : The Magic Sword - Bert I. Gordon
 1962 : Period of Adjustment - George Roy Hill
 1962 : The Wonderful World of the Brothers Grimm - Henry Levin and George Pal
 1963 : The Gun Hawk - Edward Ludwig
 1964 : Mail Order Bride - Burt Kennedy
 1965 : Village of the Giants - Bert I. Gordon
 1965 : The Money Trap - Burt Kennedy
 1965 : When the Boys Meet the Girls - Alvin Ganzer
 1965 : The Rounders - Burt Kennedy
 1966 : Hold On! - Arthur Lubin
 1966 : Return of the Seven - Burt Kennedy

References

 Testimony of a whales hunt he photographed
 lantern.mediahist.org
 lantern.mediahist.org

External links 

1899 births
1975 deaths
American cinematographers
Best Cinematographer Academy Award winners